Campbeltown is a town on the Kintyre peninsula, Argyll and Bute, Scotland.

Campbeltown may also refer to:

Places
 Campbeltown of Ardersier near Inverness, Scotland
Campbeltown (Parliament of Scotland constituency), constituency electing a Commissioner to the Estates of Scotland, 1700-1707

Ships

 HMS Campbeltown, Royal Navy ships named after the town

Other uses
Campbeltown railway station, former light railway station in Campbeltown
Campbeltown Airport, at Machrihanish, west of Campbeltown
 Campbeltown single malts, Whisky distilled in Campbeltown
 Campbeltown Loch, may refer to the loch or the song

See also

 Campbelltown (disambiguation)
 Campbellton (disambiguation)